John A. "Jack" Hindmarsh (born c. 1880) was a rugby union player who represented Australia.

Hindmarsh, a centre, was born in Brisbane, Queensland and claimed international rugby cap for Australia. His debut game was against Great Britain, at Sydney, on 2 July 1904.

References

Australian rugby union players
Australia international rugby union players
Year of death missing
Year of birth missing
Rugby union players from Brisbane
Rugby union centres